Estrella Club de Fútbol is a Spanish football team based in Santa Lucía de Tirajana, in the autonomous community of Canary Islands. Founded in 1946, it plays in Tercera División – Group 12, holding home matches at Estadio Las Palmitas.

Season to season

12 seasons in Tercera División

External links
 
La Preferente team profile 
ArefePedia profile 
Soccerway team profile

Football clubs in the Canary Islands
Sport in Las Palmas
Association football clubs established in 1946
1946 establishments in Spain